Broadcasting House (BH) is a current affairs programme produced by BBC News for BBC Radio 4, presented by Paddy O'Connell, with Jonny Dymond regularly appearing as a relief presenter. It was launched on 19 April 1998 and is broadcast every Sunday between 9am and 10am.

There used to be a weekly quiz, with a cryptic sound clue pointing to a news event in the last week. The prize was a spoon, originally a jam spoon, but then replaced by a honey spoon. The programme made frequent visits to the "BH beehive" based in southwest London. The competition was nominated for a Sony Award in 2007.

More serious features include the headlines and current affairs sections, which look at the background to recent news stories. There is also a review of the Sunday papers with guest reviewers. The BBC newsreaders work on a five-week rotation and are as follows: Chris Aldridge, Corrie Corfield, Neil Sleat, Zeb Soanes and Diana Speed.

Broadcasting Houses original presenter was Eddie Mair, who left the programme on becoming the regular sole presenter of PM in 2003.  After a period with no regular presenter, Fi Glover replaced Mair at the beginning of 2004. Matthew Bannister was the first stand-in presenter when Glover went on maternity leave, but on gaining his own new obituary strand on Radio 4, Last Word, most editions of BH in the spring/summer of 2006 were presented by Working Lunch and BBC Three presenter Paddy O'Connell. Glover did not return, instead taking on the Saturday 9am slot with Saturday Live, and on 30 August 2006, O'Connell was named as the new regular host of BH.

References

External links 
Rumsfeld's Soundbite of the Week
Broadcasting House

BBC Radio 4 programmes